The 10th Annual Grammy Awards were held on February 29, 1968, at Chicago, Los Angeles, Nashville and New York. They recognized accomplishments of musicians for the year 1967.

Award winners
Record of the Year
Johnny Rivers & Marc Gordon (producers) & The 5th Dimension for "Up, Up and Away"
Album of the Year
 The Beatles & George Martin (producer) for Sgt. Pepper's Lonely Hearts Club Band
Song of the Year
Jimmy L. Webb (songwriter) for "Up, Up and Away" performed by The 5th Dimension
Best New Artist
Bobbie Gentry

Children's
Best Recording for Children
Boris Karloff for Dr. Seuss: How the Grinch Stole Christmas

Classical
Best Classical Performance - Orchestra
Igor Stravinsky (conductor) & the Columbia Symphony Orchestra for Stravinsky: Firebird and Petrouchka Suites
Best Classical Vocal Soloist Performance
Francesco Molinari-Pradelli (conductor), Leontyne Price, & the RCA Italiana Opera Orchestra for Prima Donna, Volume 2
Best Opera Recording
Thomas Z. Shepard (producer), Pierre Boulez (conductor), Walter Berry, Ingeborg Lasser, Isabel Strauss, Fritz Uhl & the Paris National Opera Orchestra & Chorus for Berg: Wozzeck
Best Classical Choral Performance (other than opera)
Leonard Bernstein (conductor) & the London Symphony Orchestra & Choir for Mahler: Symphony No. 8 in E Flat Major (Symphony of a Thousand)
Eugene Ormandy (conductor), Robert Page (choir director), the Temple University Choir & the Philadelphia Orchestra for Orff: Catulli Carmina
Best Classical Performance - Instrumental Soloist or Soloists (with or without orchestra)
Vladimir Horowitz for Horowitz in Concert (Haydn, Schumann, Scriabin, Debussy, Mozart, Chopin)
Best Chamber Music Performance
Ravi Shankar & Yehudi Menuhin for West Meets East
Album of the Year, Classical
John McClure (producer), Leonard Bernstein (conductor), various artists & the London Symphony Orchestra for Mahler: Symphony No. 8 (Symphony of a Thousand)
Thomas Z. Shepard (producer), Pierre Boulez (conductor), Walter Berry, Ingeborg Lasser, Isabel Strauss, Fritz Uhl, Choeur Nationale de Paris & the Orchestra of Paris National Opera for Berg: Wozzeck

Comedy
Best Comedy Performance
Bill Cosby for Revenge

Composing and arranging
Best Instrumental Theme
Lalo Schifrin (composer) for "Mission: Impossible"
Best Original Score Written for a Motion Picture or a Television Show
Lalo Schifrin (composer) for Mission: Impossible
Best Instrumental Arrangement
Burt Bacharach (arranger) for Alfie
Best Instrumental Arrangement Accompanying Vocalist(s)/Best Background Arrangement
Jimmie Haskell (arranger) for "Ode to Billie Joe" performed by Bobbie Gentry

Country
Best Country & Western Solo Vocal Performance, Female
Tammy Wynette for "I Don't Wanna Play House"
Best Country & Western Solo Vocal Performance, Male
Glen Campbell for "Gentle on My Mind"
Best Country & Western Performance Duet, Trio or Group (Vocal or Instrumental)
Johnny Cash & June Carter for "Jackson"
Best Country & Western Recording
Al De Lory (producer) & Glen Campbell for "Gentle on My Mind"
Best Country & Western Song
John Hartford (songwriter) for "Gentle on My Mind" performed by Glen Campbell

Folk
Best Folk Performance
John Hartford for Gentle On My Mind

Gospel
Best Gospel Performance
Porter Wagoner & The Blackwood Brothers for More Grand Old Gospel
Best Sacred Performance
Elvis Presley for How Great Thou Art

Jazz
Best Instrumental Jazz Performance, Small Group or Soloist With Small Group
Cannonball Adderley for Mercy, Mercy, Mercy performed by the Cannonball Adderley Quintet
Best Instrumental Jazz Performance, Large Group or Soloist with Large Group
Duke Ellington for "Far East Suite"

Musical show
Best Score From an Original Cast Show Album
Fred Ebb, John Kander (composers), Goddard Lieberson (producer) & the original cast (Joel Grey, Jill Haworth, Lotte Lenya, Jack Gilford & Bert Convy) for Cabaret

Packaging and notes
Best Album Cover, Graphic Arts
Jann Haworth & Peter Blake (art directors) for Sgt. Pepper's Lonely Hearts Club Band performed by The Beatles
Best Album Cover, Photography
Robert Cato & John Berg (art directors) & Roland Scherman (photographer) for Bob Dylan's Greatest Hits performed by Bob Dylan
Best Album Notes
John D. Loudermilk (notes writer) for Suburban Attitudes in Country Verse performed by John D. Loudermilk

Pop
Best Vocal Performance, Female
Bobbie Gentry for "Ode to Billie Joe"
Best Vocal Performance, Male
Glen Campbell for "By the Time I Get to Phoenix"
Best Performance by a Vocal Group
The 5th Dimension for "Up, Up and Away"
Best Performance by a Chorus
Johnny Mann for "Up, Up and Away" performed by the Johnny Mann Singers
Best Instrumental Performance
Chet Atkins for Chet Atkins Picks the Best
Best Contemporary Female Solo Vocal Performance
Bobbie Gentry for "Ode to Billie Joe"
Best Contemporary Male Solo Vocal Performance
Glen Campbell for "By the Time I Get to Phoenix"
Best Contemporary Group Performance (Vocal or Instrumental)
The 5th Dimension for "Up, Up and Away"
Best Contemporary Single
Johnny Rivers & Marc Gordon (producers) & The 5th Dimension for "Up, Up and Away"
Best Contemporary Album
George Martin (producer) & The Beatles for Sgt. Pepper's Lonely Hearts Club Band

Production and engineering
Best Engineered Recording - Non-Classical
Geoff E. Emerick (engineer) for Sgt. Pepper's Lonely Hearts Club Band performed by The Beatles
Best Engineered Recording, Classical
Edward T. Graham (engineer) & the Philadelphia Brass Ensemble for The Glorious Sound of Brass

R&B
Best R&B Solo Vocal Performance, Female
Aretha Franklin for "Respect"
Best R&B Solo Vocal Performance, Male
Lou Rawls for "Dead End Street"
Best Rhythm & Blues Group Performance, Vocal or Instrumental
Sam & Dave for "Soul Man"
Best Rhythm & Blues Recording
Aretha Franklin for "Respect"

Spoken

Best Spoken Word, Documentary or Drama Recording
Everett M. Dirksen for Gallant Men

References

 010
1968 in California
1968 in Illinois
1968 in Los Angeles
1968 in Tennessee
1968 music awards
20th century in Chicago
20th century in Nashville, Tennessee
1968 in New York City
1968 in American music
February 1968 events in the United States